Culver Commercial Historic District is a national historic district located at Culver, Marshall County, Indiana.  The district encompasses 14 contributing buildings in the central business district of Culver.  It developed between about 1900 and 1935, and includes examples of Italianate, Colonial Revival, and Bungalow / American Craftsman style architecture.  Notable buildings include the Osborn Block (c. 1900), Menser Building (1903), Carnegie Library (1916), U.S. Post Office (1935), Service STation (c. 1935), Knights of Pythias Marmont Lodge 231 (c. 1915), and State Exchange Bank (c. 1914).

It was listed in the National Register of Historic Places in 1996.

References

Historic districts on the National Register of Historic Places in Indiana
Colonial Revival architecture in Indiana
Italianate architecture in Indiana
Historic districts in Marshall County, Indiana
National Register of Historic Places in Marshall County, Indiana